James Davidson (born 16 September 1973) is a British former professional tennis player.

Biography
Davidson played in the doubles main draws of two ATP Tour tournaments, the 1999 Bournemouth International and 2000 Brighton International.

At the age of 26 he made his first main draw at Wimbledon in 2000, as a wildcard pairing with Oliver Freelove. They were beaten in their first round match in four sets by Paul Kilderry and Alberto Martín.

He partnered with Victoria Davies at the 2001 Wimbledon Championships. The wildcard pair won a long second set tiebreak 10–8 but went down in the third, to Julien Boutter and Nathalie Dechy.

A former coach of Aljaž Bedene, he has been coaching London based Frenchman Jérémy Chardy since 2018.

References

External links
 
 

1973 births
Living people
British male tennis players
English male tennis players
English tennis coaches
Place of birth missing (living people)